Hot Stuff is a 1929 American comedy film directed by Mervyn LeRoy and written by Robert S. Carr, Humphrey Pearson and Louis Stevens. It stars Alice White and features Louise Fazenda, William Bakewell, Doris Dawson, Ben Hall and Charles Sellon. The film was released by First National Pictures on May 5, 1929.

Cast
Alice White as Barbara Allen
Louise Fazenda as Aunt Kate
William Bakewell as Mack Moran
Doris Dawson as Thelma
Ben Hall as Sandy McNab
Charles Sellon as Wiggam
Buddy Messinger as Tuffy
Andy Devine as Bob
Larry Banthim as cop

References

External links
 
 

1929 films
1920s English-language films
Warner Bros. films
Silent American comedy films
1929 comedy films
Films directed by Mervyn LeRoy
American black-and-white films
1920s American films